Telkwa station is a railway station in Telkwa, British Columbia. It is on the Canadian National Railway mainline and serves Via Rail as a flag stop for the Jasper – Prince Rupert train.

References

External links 
Via Rail Station Description

Via Rail stations in British Columbia